Apelles was a painter of ancient Greece.

Apelles may alsorefer to:

Apelles (gnostic), the founder of a Gnostic sect in the 2nd century
Apelles of Heraklion, one of the Seventy Disciples
"Apelles", a pseudonym used by Jesuit Christoph Scheiner in writing on sunspots
Apelles, a synonym for the butterfly genus Glaucopsyche
 , an 1808 British Royal Navy ship
 Matthäus Apelles von Löwenstern (1594–1648), German psalmist, musician and statesman